Lunkho e Dosare is a mountain in the Hindu Kush mountains.

See also
 List of mountains by elevation
 List of Ultras of the Karakoram and Hindu Kush

References

Afghanistan–Pakistan border
International mountains of Asia
Landforms of Badakhshan Province
Mountains of Afghanistan
Mountains of Khyber Pakhtunkhwa
Mountains of Pakistan
Mountains of the Hindu Kush
Six-thousanders of the Hindu Kush
Wakhan